Moriarty is an Irish surname. It may also refer to:

Places
 Moriarty, New Mexico, United States, a city
 Moriarty Air Force Station, a closed United States Air Force radar station
 Mount Moriarty, British Columbia, Canada
 Moriarty, Tasmania, a locality in Tasmania, Australia
 Moriarty Rocks, Tasmania, Australia
 5048 Moriarty, a main-belt asteroid

Arts and entertainment

Fictional characters
 Professor Moriarty, Sherlock Holmes' nemesis
 Jim Moriarty, one of the main antagonists in the British TV series Sherlock
 Jamie Moriarty, aka Irene Adler, in the TV series Elementary
 Moriarty, aka Mira Troy, in the 2022 movie Enola Holmes 2, starring Millie Bobby Brown
 Jack Moriarty, in the Holmes-inspired television series House
 Count Jim Moriarty, character in The Goon Show
 Moriarty, from In Error in Rudyard Kipling's Plain Tales from the Hills
 Dean Moriarty, in the novel On the Road by Jack Kerouac
 Moriarty, in the 1970 film Kelly's Heroes
 Colin Moriarty, crime boss and owner of Moriarty's Saloon in the video game Fallout 3
 Mark Moriarty, in the 1993 DOS game Eagle Eye Mysteries

Other
 Moriarty (band), a French-American group
 Moriarty (novel), by Anthony Horowitz

People
 Moriarty (name), a surname